Berrington is a village in Northumberland, in England. It is situated to the south of Berwick-upon-Tweed, inland from the North Sea coast.

Governance 
Berrington is in the parliamentary constituency of Berwick-upon-Tweed.

Landmarks
The Devil's Causeway passes the eastern edge of the settlement. The causeway is a Roman road which starts at Port Gate on Hadrian's Wall, north of Corbridge, and extends  northwards across Northumberland to the mouth of the River Tweed at Berwick-upon-Tweed.

Villages in Northumberland